Karl Bickleder (October 21, 1888 in Bayerbach bei Ergoldsbach - February 4, 1958 in Straubing) was a German politician, representative of the Bavarian People's Party and the Christian Social Union of Bavaria. He was a representative of the Landtag of Bavaria.

See also
List of Bavarian Christian Social Union politicians

References

Christian Social Union in Bavaria politicians
1888 births
1958 deaths
Members of the Reichstag of the Weimar Republic